Ambassadors from Japan to South Korea started when Toshikazu Maeda presented his credentials to the Korean government in 1965.

Diplomatic relations were established by the Treaty on Basic Relations between Japan and the Republic of Korea in 1965. The current official title of this diplomat is "Ambassador of Japan to the Republic of Korea."

Japanese-Korean diplomatic relations were initially established during the Joseon period of Korean history.

When the Japan-Korea Treaty of 1876 was negotiated, diplomatic relations were established on a basis of equality, i.e., "Chosen (Korea) being an independent State enjoys the same sovereign rights as does Japan." Ministers from Japan were appointed in accordance with this treaty.

Diplomatic relations between the two neighboring nations were interrupted in 1905.

In 1965, diplomatic relations were re-established.

List of heads of mission

Chargé d'affairs and Ministers
 Kuroda Kiyotaka, Special envoy, 1876-1877
 Hanabusa Yoshitada, appointed chargé d'affairs, November 25, 1877
 S. Takesoye, appointed minister, January 7, 1883
 K. Takahira, appointed chargé d'affairs, June 23, 1885
 T. Kajiyama, appointed minister, April 17, 1891
 M. Oishi, appointed minister, January 25, 1883
 Ōtori Keisuke, appointed minister, September 28, 1893
 Inoue Kaoru, appointed minister, October 26, 1894
 Miura Goro, appointed minister, September 1, 1895
 Komura Jutarō, appointed minister, October 19, 1895
 K. Hara, appointed minister, July 7, 1896
 M. Kato, appointed minister, February 24, 1897
 Hayashi Gonsuke, appointed minister, June 25, 1899
 Enjiro Yamaza, appointed chargé d'affairs, February 6, 1901
 Hayashi Gonsuke, appointed chargé d'affairs, February 13, 1903

Ambassadors
 Toshikazu Maeda, 1965-1966
 Shiroshichi Kimura, 1966-1968
 Masahide Kanayama, 1968-1972
 Torao Ushiroku, 1972-1975
 Akira Nishiyama, 1975-1977
 Sunobe Ryoji, 1977-1981
 Toshikazu Maeda, 1981-1984
 Kiyohisa Mikanagi, 1984-1987
 Shinichi Yanai, 1987-1990
 Kenichi Yanagi, 1990-1992
 Toshio Goto, 1992-1994
 Shintaro Yamashita, 1994-1997
 Kazuo Ogoura, 1997-1999
 Terusuke Terada, 2000-2003
 Toshiyuki Takano, 2003-2005.
 Shotaro Oshima, 2005-2007.
 Toshinori Shigeie, 2007-2010
 Masatoshi Muto, 2010-2012
 Bessho Hiroshi Shiro, 2012-2016
 Yasumasa Nagamine, 2016-2019
 Koji Tomita, 2019-2021
 Koichi Aiboshi, 2021–present

See also
 Japanese embassy in Seoul 
 Japan-Korea Treaty of 1876
 List of diplomatic missions in South Korea

Notes

References
 Halleck, Henry Wager. (1861).  International law: or, Rules regulating the intercourse of states in peace and war 	New York: D. Van Nostrand. OCLC 852699
 Korean Mission to the Conference on the Limitation of Armament, Washington, D.C., 1921-1922. (1922). Korea's Appeal to the Conference on Limitation of Armament. Washington: U.S. Government Printing Office. OCLC 12923609

Korea South
Japan